Norman Davis may refer to:

Norman Davis (diplomat) (1878–1944), American diplomat
Norman Davis (academic) (1913–1989), British professor of English language
Norman Davis (American football) (born 1945), American football player

See also
Norman Davies (born 1939), English historian